In mathematics, the complexification of a vector space  over the field of real numbers (a "real vector space") yields a vector space  over the complex number field, obtained by formally extending the scaling of vectors by real numbers to include their scaling ("multiplication") by complex numbers.

Formal definition 
Let  be a real vector space.

The subscript, on the tensor product indicates that the tensor product is taken over the real numbers (since  is a real vector space this is the only sensible option anyway, so the subscript can safely be omitted). As it stands,  is only a real vector space. However, we can make  into a complex vector space by defining complex multiplication as follows:

More generally, complexification is an example of extension of scalars – here extending scalars from the real numbers to the complex numbers – which can be done for any field extension, or indeed for any morphism of rings.

Formally, complexification is a functor , from the category of real vector spaces to the category of complex vector spaces. This is the adjoint functor – specifically the left adjoint – to the forgetful functor  forgetting the complex structure.

This forgetting of the complex structure of a complex vector space  is called  (or sometimes ""). The decomplexification of a complex vector space  with basis  removes the possibility of complex multiplication of scalars, thus yielding a real vector space  of twice the dimension with a basis

Basic properties 
By the nature of the tensor product, every vector  in  can be written uniquely in the form

It is a common practice to drop the tensor product symbol and just write

Multiplication by the complex number  is then given by the usual rule

We can then regard  as the direct sum of two copies of :

with the above rule for multiplication by complex numbers.

There is a natural embedding of  into  given by

Alternatively, rather than using tensor products, one can use this direct sum as the definition of the complexification:

where  is given a linear complex structure by the operator  defined as  where  encodes the operation of “multiplication by ”. In matrix form,  is given by:

This yields the identical space – a real vector space with linear complex structure is identical data to a complex vector space – though it constructs the space differently. This approach is more concrete, and has the advantage of avoiding the use of the technically involved tensor product, but is ad hoc.

Examples 
 The complexification of real coordinate space  is the complex coordinate space .
 Likewise, if  consists of the  matrices with real entries,  would consist of  matrices with complex entries.

Dickson doubling 

Next two copies of R are used to form  with the complex conjugation introduced as the involution .

Finally, the doubled set is given a norm .
If one doubles , and uses conjugation (a,b)* = (a*, –b), the construction yields quaternions. Doubling again produces octonions, also called Cayley numbers. It was at this point that Dickson in 1919 contributed to uncovering algebraic structure.

When this  is doubled it produces bicomplex numbers, and doubling that produces biquaternions, and doubling again results in bioctonions. When the base algebra is associative, the algebra produced by this Cayley–Dickson construction is called a composition algebra since it can be shown that it has the property

Complex conjugation 
The complexified vector space  has more structure than an ordinary complex vector space. It comes with a canonical complex conjugation map:

defined by
 

Conversely, given a complex vector space  with a complex conjugation ,  is isomorphic as a complex vector space to the complexification  of the real subspace

In other words, all complex vector spaces with complex conjugation are the complexification of a real vector space.

For example, when  with the standard complex conjugation

the invariant subspace  is just the real subspace .

Linear transformations 
Given a real linear transformation   between two real vector spaces there is a natural complex linear transformation

given by

The map  is called the complexification of f. The complexification of linear transformations satisfies the following properties

In the language of category theory one says that complexification defines an (additive) functor from the category of real vector spaces to the category of complex vector spaces.

Moreover, a complex linear map  is the complexification of a real linear map if and only if it commutes with conjugation.

Dual spaces and tensor products

That is,

The isomorphism is given by

Complex conjugation is then given by the usual operation

Given a real linear map  we may extend by linearity to obtain a complex linear map . That is,

More generally, given real vector spaces  and  there is a natural isomorphism

Complexification also commutes with the operations of taking tensor products, exterior powers and symmetric powers.

Note the left-hand tensor product is taken over the reals while the right-hand one is taken over the complexes. The same pattern is true in general. For instance, one has

In all cases, the isomorphisms are the “obvious” ones.

See also 
Extension of scalars – general process
Linear complex structure
Baker–Campbell–Hausdorff formula

References 

 

Complex manifolds
Vector spaces